Group I of the 2014–15 EuroChallenge is the first group of the Last 16 phase. It consisted of Enel Brindisi, Energia Târgu Jiu, Okapi Aalstar, and BC Astana. Play began on 13 January 2015 and will end on 24 February.

Standings

References

Group I
2014–15 in Romanian basketball
2014–15 in Italian basketball
2014–15 in Kazakhstani basketball
2014–15 in Belgian basketball